Georgian languages may refer to:
Languages of Georgia, all languages spoken in Georgia (the country in the Caucasus)
Kartvelian languages, a family of related languages spoken primarily in Georgia (the country)
Languages of Georgia (U.S. state)